Chinkhoy  (Chechen: Ч1инхой; Russian: Чинхой), also known as Chinnakhoy (Chechen: Ч1иннахой), is a Chechen teip.

Notable members 
 Akhmed Zakayev (1959), Chechen separatist leader and head of the government of the Chechen Republic of Ichkeria in exile
 Beslan Gantamirov (1963), Chechen politician, former mayor of Grozny (1991-1993) and one of the leaders on the Russian side of the Battle of Grozny (1999–2000)

Chechen Republic of Ichkeria